Shiren the Wanderer Gaiden: Asuka the Swordswoman is a roguelike role-playing video game developed by Neverland. It is part of the Mystery Dungeon series, and is a side story based on the Shiren the Wanderer series. It was originally released for the Dreamcast by Sega on February 7, 2002. A Microsoft Windows port would be later released on December 20, 2002 and re-released later with internet compatibility on February 27, 2004, both published by Chunsoft.

Gameplay
Instead of the conventional main character Shiren, the game's protagonist is this time Asuka, who was a member of Shiren back in the Nintendo 64 title Shiren the Wanderer 2: Oni Invasion! Shiren Castle!.

Online features
New to the Mystery Dungeon series at the time was the addition of online support. The Dreamcast version of the online service, "Sanzu no Kawaraban", ended on August 31, 2002. The Windows version has ended on September 30, 2005, but was then distributed from Spike Chunsoft's official website as a free downloadable content. Within the online support, players would receive new dungeons, called either "Weekly Dungeon"; a dungeon that can be played online on a weekly basis, or "Challenge Dungeon"; the dungeon's difficulty would be increased and useful items would appear less frequently.

Plot
As the title suggests, it is a side story of the Shiren the Wanderer series. The plot of Swordswoman Asuka Arrives! is divided into two, with an ending corresponding for each story: the Koga and Hachimaten plot.

Koga
Set in Tenwakuni. During the trip, Asuka stops at Jurokuya no Sato, a small rural village in a country rich in nature called Tenwakuni, and reunites with the narrative Itachi Koppa who was staying there. In the country, there have been a series of incidents in which the Koga Ninja army, which originally used to exterminate monsters as a livelihood, seem to have recently started attacking travelers. After seeing the upset villagers, Asuka decides to head towards Koga's Castle, the base of the Koga Ninja Army, to find out why he has changed suddenly.

Hachimaten
A trouble happened in the festival; it cannot be held because the "festival's equipment" required for the famous "Reeva Festival" has been stolen by a monster called Hachimaten. Along with the large number of visitors who gathered under the shrine maiden Koyori, the organizer of the festival, Asuka is also called to the "Trial of ..." by one of the Eight Rivanian Beast Gods, besides the God of Trade, Sakai, in order to recover the ritual vessels.

Releases
Supervised and developed by Neverland, the Dreamcast version was published by Sega on February 7, 2002, while the Windows version was published by Chunsoft on December 20, 2002. An online feature was added in its reprint on February 27, 2004.

Reception 
In an interview with the company, it was answered that a potential remake would be difficult to produce due to "various circumstances including copyright". As of 2020, the Windows port's price has increased to above ¥50,000, which is higher than its initial price back in 2004.

Sales 
The Dreamcast version of Swordswoman Asuka Arrives! has sold 50,750 copies solely in Japan by the end of 2002. Despite the game not selling a lot compared to other titles in the series, there were strong calls from the community for either a resale, port, or remake of the game.

Appearances in other games 
Similarly to Shiren, the game's protagonist Asuka appeared in other video games that were developed and, or published by Spike Chunsoft. A costume based on her can be worn in the Etrian Mystery Dungeon sub-series labeled as the Wanderer class, if the character is female. Asuka, along with Shiren, appear in RPG Maker MV, and as alternative costumes for Cadence in Crypt of the NecroDancer with characters from series developed by Spike Chunsoft such as Danganronpa and Kenka Bancho.

Footnotes

Notes

References

External links
 Chunsoft's  
 Sega's  (Archived) 

2002 video games
Chunsoft games
Dreamcast games
Japan-exclusive video games
Mystery Dungeon
Neverland (company) games
Roguelike video games
Single-player video games
Video games developed in Japan
Video games scored by Hayato Matsuo
Video games using procedural generation
Windows games